This compilation of films covers all sports activities. Sports films have been made since the era of silent films, such as the 1915 film The Champion starring Charlie Chaplin. Films in this genre can range from serious (Raging Bull) to silly (Horse Feathers). A classic theme for sports films is the triumph of an individual or team who prevail despite the difficulties, standard elements of melodrama.

Team Sport

American football

Association football

Basketball

Baseball

Ice Hockey

Australian rules Football

Cheerleading and dance

Cricket

Curling

Field hockey

Handball

Kabaddi

Lacrosse

Rugby

Volleyball

Water polo

Triathlon

Racing sports

Auto racing

Aviation sport

Motorcycle racing

Motorboat racing

Rowing

Sailing

Individual sport

Athletics

Boxing

Bowling

Caving

Cue sports

Fencing

Figure skating

Golf

Gymnastics

Hiking

Martial arts
Note: Films should not be listed here unless the sporting aspects of martial arts play a major part in the plot.

Mountaineering and climbing

Rollerblading

Roller skating

Shooting

Skateboarding

Skiing

Ski jumping

Snowboarding

Sumo wrestling

Surfing

Swimming & diving

Table tennis

Tennis

Underwater diving

Wrestling
Note: Lucha films are not included in this list. Although they feature luchadores (Mexican professional wrestlers) as the lead characters, the luchadores typically portray heroes (often superheroes) within non-wrestling stories (such as action, horror, or sci-fi).

Animals in sports

Fishing

Greyhound racing

Horse racing

Jousting

Polo

Rodeo

Other

E-sports
{| class="wikitable sortable"
|-
! Title
! Year
! Genre
! Notes
|-
|Beyond the Game
|2008
|Documentary
|About the world of professional video gaming, particularly of the game Warcraft III: The Frozen Throne'
|- 
| Ecstasy of Order: The Tetris Masters| 2011
|Documentary
| tell a story of the lives of several gamers from around the country as they prepare to compete in the 2010 Classic Tetris World Championship held in Los Angeles, California.
|-
| Gamer| 2011 
| 
| He tells of a young gamer, who lives with his mother in Simferopol.
|- 
| Free to Play 
| 2014 
| Documentary
| The film follows Benedict "hyhy" Lim, Danil "Dendi" Ishutin, and Clinton "Fear" Loomis, three professional Dota 2  players who participated in the first International, the most lucrative esports tournament at the time.
|- 
| The King of Arcades| 2014
| Documentary
| punk rock musician and classic arcade collector Richie Knucklez, on his journey to cultural prominence when he takes his passion for collecting to new heights by opening an arcade business in Flemington, New Jersey, only to watch it fall in the wake of economic hardship.
|-
| The King of Kong: A Fistful of Quarters| 2007
| Documentary
| follows Steve Wiebe in his attempts to take the high score record for the 1981 arcade game Donkey Kong from Billy Mitchell. 
|-
| The Lost Arcade| 2015 
| Documentary
| About the influence of the Chinatown Fair arcade on the fighting game community and New York City as a whole. 
|-
| Man vs Snake 
| 2015 
| Documentary
| film follows players as they try to accumulate a billion points on the 1982 arcade game Nibbler, a feat first achieved by Tim McVey in 1984.
|-
| Ready Player One| 2018 
| Sci-Fi
| Based on the book of the same name
|}

Fictional sports

Multiple sport movies
Note: This category is for films about sports in general or films about athletes participating in multiple sports.  This category is not for films featuring the Olympics, Paralympics, X-Games and other similar "games" which fall under the "Multisport Games / Olympics" category.  Films featuring specific sports should be listed under that specific sport.

Multi-sport Games / Olympics

Note: Films featuring the Olympics, Paralympics, X-Games, etc... and other similar events are included. Films featuring specific sports featured in the games should be listed under that specific sport

See also
 List of highest-grossing sports films
 List of films based on sports books
 List of sports video games

References
 Notes

 Citations

 Bibliography
 Armstrong, Richard B. and Mary Willems (1990) .The Movie List Book: A Reference Guide to Film Themes, Settings, and Series. McFarland. 
 Davidson, Judith A. and Adler, Daryl (1993). Sport on Film and Video. New-York: The Scarecrow Press. .
 Sicks, Kai Marcel and Stauff, Markus (eds.) (2010). Filmgenres: Sportfilm [sic]. Stuttgart: Philipp Reclam ..
 Wallenfeldt, Jeffrey H. (1989). Sports Movies: A Guide to Nearly 500 Films Focusing on Sports. CineBooks. .
 (fr) Julien Camy and Gérard Camy, Sport&Cinéma'', ed. Du Bailli de Suffren, 2016, (1200 films, 60 sports, 80 interviews)

External links
 Sports Films at filmsite.org
 Sports Movies Guide
 Dugout Videos: Baseball Films
 Hall of Fame for Movie Coaches

 
Sports